Karen Johnson is an American violinist. She began her studies at the age of 4. She has served as the concertmaster of the Juilliard Orchestra and of the Richmond Symphony Orchestra. She was also a guest concertmaster of the Phoenix Symphony, Seattle Symphony, and the Oregon Symphony in Portland. She has served as concertmaster of The "President's Own" Marine Band Chamber Orchestra.

References 

American classical violinists
Concertmasters
Year of birth missing (living people)
Living people
Juilliard School alumni
21st-century classical violinists
Women classical violinists
21st-century American women musicians
People from Gilbert, Arizona
Classical musicians from Arizona
United States Marine Band musicians
21st-century American violinists